Mark Burns may refer to:

 Mark Burns (actor) (1936–2007), English film and television actor
 Mark Burns (cricketer) (born 1967), English cricketer
 Mark Burns (pastor) (born 1979), Christian pastor and founder of the NOW Television Network
 Mark Burns (photographer) (born 1958), American landscape photographer
 Mark Burns (rugby league), professional rugby league footballer for Scotland
 Mark F. Burns (1841–1898), American politician